The men's Greco-Roman flyweight competition at the 1956 Summer Olympics in Melbourne took place from 3 December to 6 December at the Royal Exhibition Building. Nations were limited to one competitor.

Competition format
This Greco-Roman wrestling competition continued to use the "bad points" elimination system introduced at the 1928 Summer Olympics for Greco-Roman and at the 1932 Summer Olympics for freestyle wrestling, as modified in 1952 (adding medal rounds and making all losses worth 3 points—from 1936 to 1948 losses by split decision only cost 2). Each round featured all wrestlers pairing off and wrestling one bout (with one wrestler having a bye if there were an odd number). The loser received 3 points. The winner received 1 point if the win was by decision and 0 points if the win was by fall. At the end of each round, any wrestler with at least 5 points was eliminated. This elimination continued until the medal rounds, which began when 3 wrestlers remained. These 3 wrestlers each faced each other in a round-robin medal round (with earlier results counting, if any had wrestled another before); record within the medal round determined medals, with bad points breaking ties.

Results

Round 1

 Bouts

 Points

Round 2

 Bouts

 Points

Round 3

 Bouts

 Points

Round 4

 Bouts

 Points

Medal rounds

Fabra's victory over Eğribaş in round 1 and Eğribaş's victory over Solovyov in round 4 counted for the medal round. Solovyov defeated Fabra in the medal round. Solovyov won gold due to his best score within the medal rounds (a win by fall and a loss for 3 points, compared to a win by decision and a loss for 4 points for each of the other two wrestlers). Between the two remaining wrestlers, Fabra had won head-to-head, so took silver. Eğribaş finished with bronze.

 Bouts

 Points

References

Wrestling at the 1956 Summer Olympics